is a Japanese professional footballer who plays as a centre back for J.League club Júbilo Iwata.

Club statistics

Honours

Club
Yokohama F. Marinos
J1 League (1): 2019

References

External links

Profile at Júbilo Iwata

1992 births
Living people
Komazawa University alumni
Association football people from Shizuoka Prefecture
Japanese footballers
J1 League players
J2 League players
J3 League players
JEF United Chiba players
Mito HollyHock players
Fujieda MYFC players
Yokohama F. Marinos players
Júbilo Iwata players
Association football defenders